Pitcairnia epiphytica is a species of flowering plant in the family Bromeliaceae, endemic to Venezuela). It was first described by Lyman Bradford Smith in 1957.

References

epiphytica
Flora of Venezuela
Plants described in 1957